A political surgery, constituency surgery, constituency clinic, mobile office or sometimes advice surgery, in British and Irish politics, is a series of one-to-one meetings that a Member of Parliament (MP), Teachta Dála (TD) or other political officeholder may have with their constituents. At a surgery, constituents may raise issues of concern or request assistance in regard to local or national government matters. Often the constituent's issue will be followed up by a caseworker or assistant. Surgery meetings are usually confidential in contrast to town hall meetings, which are open to many people at the same time.

One meaning of the word "surgery" in British English is "the time during which a doctor, dentist or vet is available to see patients". The use in politics reflects this meaning.

It is up to each MP to decide whether they have any surgeries at all and if so, how many and in what locations. MPs often use local party offices, church halls or rooms in public houses as the venues, with a number of surgeries possibly being held at different locations around a constituency. Surgeries are traditionally held on Fridays or at weekends when MPs have returned from sittings of parliament in Westminster.  Some MPs' surgeries are "appointment only", some "drop-in", and others a mix. An MP with a large constituency will sometimes hold surgeries in a wide range of locations during the summer recess.

As an opportunity for the public to meet directly with politicians, surgeries have been noted as a significant security risk. Three MPs have been murdered at surgeries – Robert Bradford in 1981, Jo Cox in 2016 and David Amess in 2021 – and Stephen Timms and Nigel Jones survived attacks (Jones's assistant Andrew Pennington died). Security for MPs during surgeries and in constituency offices was increased after the killing of Cox.

In the Republic of Ireland, clinics/surgeries are an even more important source of publicity and contact for Teachtaí Dála (TDs) and other representatives, as under the PR-STV system there are very few truly safe seats. One paper published by Queen's University Belfast's Institute of Irish Studies states 

The term mobile office has been used in Australian politics and in American politics.

See also
Meet-the-People Sessions, a similar practice in Singapore
Town hall meeting, mainly in North America

References

Politics of the Republic of Ireland
Politics of the United Kingdom